On Tuesday, May 17, 2016, an election was held in Portland, Oregon, to elect the mayor. Ted Wheeler was elected after garnering 54% of the primary vote. Incumbent mayor Charlie Hales did not seek a second term.

Portland uses a nonpartisan system for local elections, in which all voters are eligible to participate. All candidates are listed on the ballot without any political party affiliation.

Fifteen candidates competed in a blanket primary election on May 17, 2016. As Ted Wheeler garnered 54% of the vote, a scheduled November 8 runoff election, scheduled in case that no candidate received an absolute majority, did not take place. Jules Bailey was the first runner-up in the primary, receiving 16% of the vote.

Primary

Candidates

 David C. "The Ack" Ackerman, dishwasher and photographer
 Jules Bailey, Multnomah County Commissioner and former state representative
Bruce Broussard, business owner and host of Oregon Voter Digest
 Patricia Ann "Patty" Burkett", student
 Eric Alexander Calhoun, home care worker
 Philip "Sean" Davis, author, professor, and firefighter
 Bim Ditson, small business owner, community organizer, drummer
 Steven Entwisle, kayaktivist
 Deborah Harris, business employment specialist
 Lewis E. "Lew" Humble, retired mechanic
Sarah Iannarone, restaurateur
 Trevor Manning, equity intern
 David Schor, attorney
 Jessie Sponberg, community activist
 Ted Wheeler, state treasurer of Oregon

Declined to run
 Marissa Madrigal, Multnomah County commissioner
 Jennifer Williamson, state representative

Withdrawn
The deadline for withdrawing from the race was March 11, 2016. Incumbent mayor Charlie Hales was widely seen as the frontrunner in the election, announcing his bid for re-election in March 2015. In an unexpected move in October 2015, however, Hales announced he would drop his re-election bid and focus on running the city during his final year in office.
 Charlie Hales, Mayor of Portland

Polling

Results

References

External links

Official campaign websites
 Sean Davis for Mayor
 David "The Ack" Ackerman for Mayor
 Jules Bailey for Mayor
 Bim Ditson for Mayor
 Steven Entwisle for Mayor
 Sarah Iannarone for Mayor
 David Schor for Mayor
 Jessie Sponberg for Mayor
 Ted Wheeler for Mayor

Mayoral election
2016
2016 Oregon elections
Portland, Oregon